The 3rd Session of the 11th National People's Congress held its annual meeting in March 2010 at the Great Hall of the People in Beijing, China. The event opened on March 5 and concluded on March 14, 2010.

Background
As usual the 2010 NPC commences in tandem with the 2010 session of the Chinese People's Political Consultative Conference (CPPCC), a political advisory body with a broader representation from the population, government, industry, and special interest groups.

This year's congress is focused on the economic recovery since the global financial crisis, combating inflation and tightening of banking industry. There are items introduced such as reforming the electoral laws, poverty reduction and balanced economic development.

Agenda
The agenda for this year's NPC consisted of:
State council work report delivered by Premier Wen Jiabao
Work report of the NPC Standing Committee delivered by chairman of NPC Standing Committee Wu Bangguo
Work report of the Supreme People's Court delivered by President of the Supreme People's Court Wang Shengjun
Work report of the Supreme People's Procuratorate delivered by Procurator-General Cao Jianming

Government Work Report
Premier Wen handed his government's work report during on Sunday, March 14, 2010. The report emphasized the need to maintain economic stability, growth and social stability. It is an important year to focus on economic growth which stood at around 8 percent, maintain unemployment at 4.6 percent and created 9 million jobs for urban residents.

The premier also rebuffed calls from the United States to revalue the Renminbi against the US dollar. He indicated his priorities was to maintain China's economic growth, exports and reduce unemployment. Wen claims the US was using foreign policy for its own protectionist measures such as depreciating its own currency to increase exports and asking others to appreciate their currencies.

NPC Standing Committee Work Report
Wu Bangguo the chairman of the NPC Standing Committee has reported the government has enacted Electoral Law, which grants equal representation in legislative bodies to rural and urban people. The government also has checked compliance with the 2009 Law on Food Safety and combating corruption on all levels.

Supreme People's Court Work Report
The President  of the Supreme People's Court has reported in the annual session they have handled with 13,318 cases and concluded 11,749 cases. This is up 26.2 percent and 52.1 percent year on year. Local courts processed 11.37 million cases, up by 6.3 percent from last year.

Supreme People's Procuratorate Work Report
Prosecutor-General Cao Jianming reported to congress, 2009 saw reduction in official corruption. Cao Jianming stated 2,670 officials above county level last year, including eight at the provincial or ministerial level, were investigated for corruption last year. There were 41,000 officials investigated in total. This was down 3.3 percent from last year. 32,000 cases were related to embezzlement, bribery, dereliction of duty and other work-related crimes, this is up 0.9 percent from last year.

Around 4,000 corrupt officials have escaped to Canada, the United States, Australia and other countries with over $50 billion of public funds in the last three decades, according to statistics from the Ministry of Commerce.

Cao also indicated the prosecutors need to be self-disciplined and avoid being seen as part of the graft affecting all levels of government.

See also
 National People's Congress

References

External links
NPC Official Website

National Peoples Congress, 2010
National People's Congresses